The Twins from Immenhof is a 1973 West German family drama film directed by Wolfgang Schleif and starring Heidi Brühl, Horst Janson and Olga Tschechowa. Set in Schleswig-Holstein, the film is in the post-war Heimatfilm tradition.

It is part of the series of Immenhof films, continuing on from a trilogy of 1950s films in which Brühl had starred. It was followed by a sequel Spring in Immenhof the following year.

Cast
 Heidi Brühl as Brigitte 'Dalli' Voss
 Horst Janson as Alexander Arkens
 Olga Tschechowa as Großmutter Arkens
 Birgit Westhausen as Sibylle 'Billy' Arkens
 Bettina Westhausen as Roberta 'Bobby' Arkens
 Jutta Speidel as Anke
 Katharina Brauren as Mutter Karstens, Mutter Dorfkrug
 Vera Gruber as Stine
 Bernd Herzsprung as Klaus
 Franz Schafheitlin as Dr. Tiedemann, Tierarzt
 Günter Lüdke as Ole
 Alexander Hegarth as Chef von Brigitte Voss
 Rudolf W. Marnitz as Briefträger Bormeister
 Rudolf Schündler as Lehrer Zwilling

References

Bibliography 
 Hans-Michael Bock and Tim Bergfelder. The Concise Cinegraph: An Encyclopedia of German Cinema. Berghahn Books, 2009.

External links 
 

1973 films
1973 drama films
German drama films
West German films
1970s German-language films
Films directed by Wolfgang Schleif
Films about horses
Constantin Film films
1970s German films